XSS-10 (eXperimental Small Satellite 10) was a small, low-cost micro-spacecraft developed by the U.S. Air Force Research Laboratory's Space Vehicles Directorate to test technology for line-of-sight guidance of spacecraft. The project was initiated at AFRL by Program Manager David Barnhart and completed by Georgia Tech Research Institute engineer Thom Davis and team. The project was declared a success shortly after launch.

References

External links 

 XSS Micro-Satellite at Boeing.com

Spacecraft launched in 2003
Satellites of the United States Air Force